Sven Ludwig Svennerstål (born 24 August 1990, Stockholm) is a Swedish equestrian.  At the 2012 Summer Olympics and 2016 Summer Olympics he competed in the individual eventing, and was part of the Swedish eventing team on both occasions. 

Ludwig picked up the Shearwater/ERA Rising Star Award 2013 at the Event Riders Association's annual ball. The award was given to the rider who impressed the most on the International stage in 2013, and the decision was unanimously agreed up on by the jury! At the CCI4* Badminton Horse Trials, Svennerstål with his horse Alexander IV, made a super performance around the cross country, but due to an injury the combination had to withdraw before the Show Jumping phase. At the 2013 European Championships in Malmö, Sweden, Svennerstål saddled up his 2012 Olympic ride Shamwari 4, and the combination had their hands on an individual medal, but after two poles came flying down during the final phase of show jumping they had to "settle" for a team silver for Sweden. At the Land Rover Burghley Horse Trials, King  Bob, made an overall super performance which led to a final ninth placing.

CCI***** Results

Notable Horses 

 Thelma – 1996 Chestnut Swedish Warmblood Mare (Turban Rose x Ambassadeur 518)
 2007 European Junior Championships – Team Silver Medal, Individual 16th Place
 2008 European Junior Championships – Team Seventh Place, Individual 22nd Place
 King Bob – 1999 Dark Bay Gelding
 2010 European Young Rider Championships – Individual 19th Place
 Shamwari 4 – 2002 Dark Bay Hanoverian Gelding (Star Regent XX x Der Clou)
 2011 European Young Rider Championships – Individual 21st Place
 2012 London Olympics – Team Fourth Place, Individual 20th Place
 2013 European Championships – Team Silver Medal, Individual Tenth Place
 RLE Aspe – 2008 Bay Holsteiner Mare (Singulord Joter x Levernois)
 2016 Rio Olympics – Team 11th Place, Individual 27th Place
 Paramount Importance – 2007 Gray Holsteiner Gelding (Pasco x Louis)
 2017 European Championships – Team Silver Medal, Individual 15th Place
 Box Leo – 2010 Dark Brown Swedish Warmblood Gelding (Jaguar Mail x Quite Easy)
 2017 FEI Eventing Young Horse World Championships – Fifth Place

References

1990 births
Living people
Swedish male equestrians
Olympic equestrians of Sweden
Equestrians at the 2012 Summer Olympics
Equestrians at the 2016 Summer Olympics
Sportspeople from Stockholm
Equestrians at the 2020 Summer Olympics